Neringa Siaudikyte (born 12 October) is a Lithuanian singer and songwriter. She is best known for appearances in The Voice and her songs Echo, Su Tavim and Thank You.

Early life and education
Siaudikyte was born in Kaunas in Lithuania. Her mother used to be a professional piano player. When Siaudikyte was 6 years old she joined a musical school and eventually began learning to play the piano. She started singing in a private band in her city and gained much popularity leading to her participating in international singing competitions around Europe. Later, when she was 14 years, Siaudikyte enrolled in the  Kauno Aleksandro Kačanausko musical school in Kaunas. She also acquired a bachelor’s degree in history from VDU.

Career
Siaudikyte started her career in 2012 when she signed with The Voice of Lithuania. She joined the Violeta-Terasoviene team and went to the finals. In the same year, Siaudikyte joined the Eurovision song contest of Lithuania and performed the song “Used to be” written by Raigardas Tautkus.

In 2013, Siaudikyte was selected for the Balso Deives project and he did a special performance night in Theatre Arena.

In 2014 Siaudikyte participated in the Tv show and competition Žvaigždžių duetai with famous actor Aistis Mickevicius which was broadcast on the LNK TV channel.

In 2015 Siaudikyte participated in the “UNIVERSONG” international vocal competition in Tenerif, Spain, and later in the Kaunas Talent international vocal competition where she acquired a runners up position. Siaudikyte performance at GALA concert of “Kaunas Talent'' in “Zalgirio Arena” in Kaunas.

In 2018, Siaudikyte again participated in the “Carpathia festival” International vocal competition. First time in this competition's history, a Lithuanian singer won the GRAND PRIX award.

Discography

Singles

 Echo
 Thank you
 All over
 Isejai
 Never Knew Love
 Run Away
 Viena
 Used to be
 Su Tavim
 Alone
 Man Gera
 One More Night
 Nepalik Manes

References

21st-century Lithuanian women singers
Year of birth missing (living people)
Living people